Asco is an unincorporated community located in McDowell County, West Virginia, United States. Asco was originally known as Atlantic. The current name derives from the American Smokeless Coal Company (ASCO). It lies at the end of a line of the Norfolk and Western Railroad in Davy Branch hollow.

References

External links 
Asco Holler Community Reunion

Unincorporated communities in McDowell County, West Virginia
Unincorporated communities in West Virginia